= Sea shepherd =

In word usage as on some islands (Isles of Scilly, Hebrides) a sea shepherd is a person who keeps sheep on one or more of the grassy uninhabited outlying islands, and once a year visits those islands in a boat to take away the year's breeding increase.
